10-Formyltetrahydrofolate (10-CHO-THF) is a form of tetrahydrofolate that acts as a donor of formyl groups in anabolism. In these reactions 10-CHO-THF is used as a substrate in formyltransferase reactions. 

Note of clarification on where the aldehyde (formyl) group is: in the middle portion of the compound you will see a nitrogen attached to the phenyl aromatic ring, and attached to that nitrogen you will see the carbon portion of interest (looks like a carbonyl C=O), and note that hydrogens are sometimes not shown in order to conserve space but should be implied. In this case, the hydrogen is not shown explicitly here but just note that the hydrogen can be drawn for clarification that it is an aldehyde present there (formyl group specifically, CHO, one carbon aldehyde).

Functions
Two equivalents of 10-CHO-THF are required in purine biosynthesis through the pentose phosphate pathway, where 10-CHO-THF is a substrate for phosphoribosylaminoimidazolecarboxamide formyltransferase. 

10-CHO-THF is required for the formylation of methionyl-tRNA formyltransferase to give fMet-tRNA.

Formation from methenyltetrahydrofolate
10-CHO-THF is produced from methylenetetrahydrofolate (CH2H4F) via a two step process.  The first step generates 5,10-methenyltetrahydrofolate:

CH2H4F  +  NAD+    CH2H2F  +  NADH  +  H+
In the second step 5,10-methenyltetrahydrofolate undergoes hydrolysis:
CH2H2F  +  H2O    CHO-H4F  +
The latter is equivalently written:
5,10-methenyltetrahydrofolate + H2O  10-formyltetrahydrofolate

10-CHO-THF is also produced by the reaction
ATP + formate + tetrahydrofolate  ADP + phosphate + 10-formyltetrahydrofolate
This reaction is catalyzed by formate-tetrahydrofolate ligase.

It can be converted back into tetrahydrofolate (THF) by formyltetrahydrofolate dehydrogenase or THF and formate by formyltetrahydrofolate deformylase.

References

Folates
Coenzymes